Alfred Sole (July 2, 1943 – February 14, 2022) was an American production designer, film director, producer, and writer best known for directing such films as Alice, Sweet Alice (1976) and Pandemonium (1982). Prior to beginning his career in film, Sole worked as an architect. From the 1990s, he worked as a production designer on various television films and series, including Veronica Mars (2004–2007) and Castle (2009–2016).

Biography
Sole was born July 2, 1943, in Paterson, New Jersey, where he was then raised. He graduated from the University of Florence in Italy with a degree in architecture and spent his young adulthood working as an architect.

In 1972 Sole made his directorial debut with his erotic film Deep Sleep. Even though the film made a budget of $25,000, the movie was pulled from theaters on charges that it was obscene, and all the prints were confiscated.

Sole's second feature, Alice, Sweet Alice fared better. The film was the feature debut of Brooke Shields, who appeared in a supporting part. The film initially did poorly in theaters due to spotty distribution. It was later rereleased in 1981 as Holy Terror, marketing upon the popularity of Brooke Shields. Alice, Sweet Alice eventually proved to have an enduring popularity : in 2017, it was ranked the fourth-best slasher film of all time by Complex magazine.

Sole's next feature Tanya's Island, starring Vanity, also did poorly in theaters. In 1982 his slasher film Pandemonium premiered. It was the last feature film Sole directed. Thereafter Sole worked as a production designer for multiple TV movies and shows. He co-wrote two episodes of Hotel with Paul Monette. From 2009 to 2016, Sole served as the production designer for the network series Castle.

In the late-2010s, Sole relocated from Los Angeles to a farm in Salt Lake City, Utah, with his husband, Rodrigo.

Sole died by suicide at his home in Salt Lake City, Utah on February 14, 2022, at the age of 78. He was survived by his son, Rueben, and husband, Rodrigo.

Filmography

Film

Television

References

Sources

External links

1943 births
2022 deaths
2022 suicides
Architects from New Jersey
American LGBT screenwriters
American male screenwriters
American male television writers
American production designers
American television writers
Film directors from New Jersey
Film producers from New Jersey
LGBT film directors
LGBT people from New Jersey
Screenwriters from New Jersey
Suicides in Utah
University of Florence alumni
Writers from Paterson, New Jersey